Örnsköldsvik Municipality is one of Sweden's 290 municipalities, in Västernorrland County in northern Sweden. Its seat is in the town Örnsköldsvik. The present municipality was created in 1971 by the amalgamation of the City of Örnsköldsvik with seven former rural municipalities.

Geography 
Örnsköldsvik is situated near the northern end of the "High Coast", which is a UNESCO World Heritage Site and has the third longest suspension bridge in Europe, the Höga Kusten Bridge.
The city is located around 100 km south of Umeå and 550 km north of Stockholm. The area is dominated by forest, but it also contains minor areas of agriculture.

Localities
The municipality of Örnsköldsvik consists of a number of parishes, within which are towns and villages. The population is distributed as follows:

Parish (town) number of citizens (31 December 2005):
 Örnsköldsvik: 9,123
 Arnäs: 7,653
 Anundsjö: 4,100
 Bredbyn: 1,216
 Mellansel: 821
 Skorped: 667
 Sidensjö: 1,192
 Nätra: 5,402
 Bjästa: 1,777
 Köpmanholmen: 1,263
 Själevad: 18,960
 Domsjö
 Gullänget
 Sund
 Gene
 Mo: 1,309
 Grundsunda: 3,214
 Gideå: 1,215
 Björna: 1,586
 Trehörningsjö: 522
 Gottne: 250

Total: 54,943

Transportation 
Main road transportations are provided by the European route E4. The Örnsköldsvik Airport provides daily flights to and from the Stockholm-Arlanda Airport courtesy of Höga Kusten Flyg, and also charter flights to Turkey courtesy of Pegasus Airlines. Railway transportation will in the future be provided by high-speed railway Botniabanan, which is currently under construction. There is also a harbour, where cargo ships load and unload timber and other merchandise. In North America the town is known for its excellent hockey players, a number of whom play with the NHL.

Recreation and sports 
Due to the hilly surroundings, hiking and exploring the scenery of the High Coast is popular in the area. In the wintertime, skiing is popular. Both cross-country skiing, alpine skiing and even ski jumping is practiced almost in the downtown area. Since Örnsköldsvik is a coastal town, there are also beaches near town, as well as campsites. There's also an indoor water park called Paradisbadet, with one of the longest water slides in Europe.

Sports is also popular, the main spectator sport in town is ice hockey, with the local team Modo Hockey in Swedish Hockey League, the main league for ice hockey in Sweden. The local football teams are not quite as successful, but still pretty popular, on the men's side especially the teams Friska Viljor FC from central Örnsköldsvik and Anundsjö IF from Bredbyn outside of town, and women's Själevads IK. A couple floorball teams from town have also had some success.

Notable people
Örnsköldsvik is the birthplace of many world-famous ice hockey players, including Nils Johansson, Per Svartvadet, Peter Forsberg, Markus Näslund, Niklas Sundström, Andreas Salomonsson, Magnus Wernblom, Mattias Timander, Victor Hedman, Tobias Enström, and the twins Daniel and Henrik Sedin. The Sedin twins were top players for the Vancouver Canucks, and Hedman plays for the Tampa Bay Lightning. Many stars from hockey's previous generation, including Anders Hedberg, Thomas Gradin, and Anders Kallur were also either Örnsköldsvik natives (Hedberg) and/or played in the town for the Modo Hockey club.

Frida Östberg, footballer
Malin Moström, footballer
Miah Persson, soprano
Magdalena Forsberg, cross country skier and biathlete
Hans Hedberg, sculptor known for his ceramic fruit
Märta Norberg, cross country skier
Tomas Haake and Mårten Hagström, musicians, members of Meshuggah
Thomas Hammarberg, diplomat and human rights activist
Niklas Edin, curling player
Fredrik Lindström, biathlete
Mikael Bohman, ice hockey player
Maud Olofsson, politician, leader of the Swedish Centre Party in 2001–2011, Minister for Enterprise and Energy and Deputy Prime Minister of Sweden
Åsa Domeij, politician and agronomist by training, member of the Riksdag in 1988–1991 and 2002–2006
Solveig Hellquist, politician, member of the Riksdag 2002–2010
Emma Nordin, ice hockey player.
Peter Artedi, naturalist, known as the "father of ichthyology"
Malin Hållberg-Leuf, figure skater, Swedish national champion
Eilert Pilarm, Elvis impersonator
Kristina Lundberg, ice hockey player, Olympic medalist

Notable residents 
 Markus Näslund, and twin brothers Daniel and Henrik Sedin, are all from Örnsköldsvik Municipality; Naslund played for the Vancouver Canucks from 1996 to 2008 and his number was retired by the team in honour of his many accomplishments in December 2010, while the Sedins are captain and deputy captain of the team in 2010–11.

Twin towns – sister cities

Örnsköldsvik is twinned with:
 Äänekoski, Finland
 Hveragerði, Iceland
 Ikast-Brande, Denmark
 Sigdal, Norway
 Tarp, Germany

Etymology 
 The original town was named after County Governor Per Abraham Örnsköld 
 The name Örnsköldsvik is sometimes unofficially translated into English as Eagleshieldsbay.

See also 
 1976 Winter Paralympics
 Modo Hockey

References

External links 

 Örnsköldsvik – Official site
 Örnsköldsvik Guide 
 Örnsköldsvik Tourist Information (available in English, German and Swedish)
 Mid-Sweden University College at Örnsköldsvik
 Campus Örnsköldsvik at Umeå University
  Örnsköldsvik airport
  article Örnsköldsvik from Nordisk Familjebok (1922).

 
Municipalities of Västernorrland County